Eatoniella atervisceralis is a species of marine gastropod mollusc in the family Eatoniellidae. It was first described by Winston F. Ponder in 1965. It is endemic to the waters of New Zealand.

Description

Eatoniella atervisceralis has a minute, conical smooth shell, and is yellowish white in colour. The animal's body is pigmented with black blotches, while the head and foot are unpigmented.  The species measures 1.23 millimetres by 0.75 millimetres.

The species resembles Eatoniella pullmitra, however can be told apart by its smaller umbilicus and colour.

Distribution
The species is endemic to New Zealand. The holotype of the species was collected in October 1951 from Lonnekers Beach in Stewart Island by E.C. Smith, found amongst coralline algae at low tide. Specimens have been found in the North Island, often amongst seaweed.

References

Eatoniellidae
Gastropods described in 1965
Gastropods of New Zealand
Endemic fauna of New Zealand
Endemic molluscs of New Zealand
Molluscs of the Pacific Ocean
Taxa named by Winston Ponder